This is a list of modern artists: important artists who have played a role in the history of modern art, dating from the late 19th century until (approximately) the 1970s. Artists who have been at the height of their activity since that date, can be found in the list of contemporary artists.

A
 Nadir Afonso
 Yaacov Agam
 Ellinor Aiki
 Josef Albers
 Pierre Alechinsky
 Nathan Altman
 Irving Amen
 Constantine Andreou
 Karel Appel
 Félix Arauz
 Alexander Archipenko
 Mino Argento
 Arman
 Jean Arp
 Art & Language
 David Ascalon
 Frank Auerbach
 Edward Avedisian
 Milton Avery
 Alice Aycock

B
 Francis Bacon
 Giacomo Balla
 Balthus
 Vladimir Baranoff-Rossine
 Romare Bearden
 Max Beckmann
 George Bellows
 Thomas Hart Benton
 José Bernal
 Joseph Beuys
 Ralph Albert Blakelock
 Norman Bluhm
 Umberto Boccioni
 Alexander Bogomazov
 Pierre Bonnard
 Fernando Botero
 Louise Bourgeois
 Constantin Brâncuși
 Georges Braque
 Marcel Broodthaers
 James Brooks
 Joan Brown
 Daniel Buren
 David Burliuk
 Wladimir Burliuk

C
 Paul Cadmus
 Alexander Calder
 Josef Čapek
 Norman Carlberg
 Emily Carr
 Carlo Carrà
 Clarence Holbrook Carter
 Mary Cassatt
 Carlos Catasse
 Elizabeth Catlett
 Vija Celmins
 Paul Cézanne
 Marc Chagall
 John Chamberlain
 Giorgio de Chirico
 Dan Christensen
 Chuck Close
 Charles Conder
 Theo Constanté
 William Copley
 Joseph Cornell
 Tony Cragg

D
 Leon Dabo
 Salvador Dalí
 Gene Davis
 Ronald Davis
 Stuart Davis
 Lawrence Daws
 Michael J. Deas
 Edgar Degas
 Jay DeFeo
 Robert Delaunay
 Sonia Delaunay
 Charles Demuth
 André Derain
 Giorgio De Vincenzi
 Richard Diebenkorn
 Jim Dine
 Otto Dix
 Theo van Doesburg
 Jean Dubuffet
 Marcel Duchamp
 Elizabeth Durack
 Arthur Durston
 Friedel Dzubas

E
 Aleksandra Ekster
 James Ensor
 Max Ernst
 M. C. Escher

F
 Demetrios Farmakopoulos
 Paul Feeley
 Lyonel Feininger
 Pavel Filonov
 Sam Francis
 Jane Frank
 Helen Frankenthaler
 Lucian Freud
Yitzhak Frenkel Frenel
 Fang Ganmin
 Wilhelmina Weber Furlong

G
 Naum Gabo
 Joaquín Torres García
 Enrico Garff
 Paul Gauguin
 Ilka Gedő
 Nina Genke-Meller
 Gunther Gerzso
 Alberto Giacometti
 Sam Gilliam
 William Glackens
 Vincent van Gogh
 Elias Goldberg
 Michael Goldberg
 Natalia Goncharova
 Robert Goodnough
 Arshile Gorky
 Józef Gosławski
 Adolph Gottlieb
 Nancy Graves
 Cleve Gray
 Balcomb Greene
 Stephen Greene
 Juan Gris
 Red Grooms
 George Grosz
 Oswaldo Guayasamín
 İsmet Güney
 Philip Guston

H
 Elaine Hamilton
 Richard Hamilton
 Duane Hanson
 Grace Hartigan
 Raoul Hausmann
 Michael Heizer
 Patrick Hennessy
 Barbara Hepworth
 Patrick Heron
 Eva Hesse
 Charles Hinman 
 Hannah Höch
 David Hockney
 Howard Hodgkin
 Frances Hodgkins
 Hans Hofmann
 Edward Hopper
 Istvan Horkay
 Ralph Hotere
 John Hoyland
 Friedensreich Hundertwasser

I
 René Iché
 Leiko Ikemura
 Robert Indiana

J
 Augustus John
 Jasper Johns
 Ray Johnson
 Joan Jonas
 Asger Jorn
 Donald Judd

K
 Frida Kahlo
 Wolf Kahn
 Wassily Kandinsky
 Ellsworth Kelly
 Ernst Ludwig Kirchner
 Paul Klee
 Gustav Klimt
 Yves Klein
 Franz Kline
 Hilma af Klint
 Ivan Kliun
 Oskar Kokoschka
 Willem de Kooning
 Albert Kotin
 Lee Krasner
 Nicholas Krushenick
 František Kupka
 Kyung-hee Hong

L
 Wifredo Lam
 Ronnie Landfield
 John Latham
 Jacob Lawrence
 Fernand Léger
 Alfred Leslie
 Sol LeWitt
 Roy Lichtenstein
 Richard Lippold
 Charles Logasa
 Elfriede Lohse-Wächtler
 Morris Louis
 Lin Fengmian

M
 Stanton Macdonald-Wright
 August Macke
 Konrad Mägi
 René Magritte
 Aristide Maillol
 Kasimir Malevich
 Édouard Manet
 Robert Mangold
 Totte Mannes
 Piero Manzoni
 Franz Marc
 Conrad Marca-Relli
 Brice Marden
Bruce McLean
 John Marin
 Marino Marini
 Chris Marker
 Agnes Martin
 Eugene J. Martin
 Knox Martin
 André Masson
 Henri Matisse
 Roberto Matta
 Gordon Matta-Clark
 Mikuláš Medek
 Vadim Meller
 Ana Mendieta
 Carlos Mérida
 Mario Merz
 Manolo Millares
 Joan Miró
 Joan Mitchell
 Stanley Matthew Mitruk
 Amedeo Modigliani
 László Moholy-Nagy
 Luis Molinari
 Piet Mondrian
 Claude Monet
 Henry Moore
 Giorgio Morandi
 Gustave Moreau
 Robert Motherwell
 Alfons Mucha
 Edvard Munch

N
 Bruce Nauman
 Manuel Neri
 G. P. Nerli
 Louise Nevelson
 Neith Nevelson
 Roy Newell
 Barnett Newman
 Alexander Ney
 Jan Nieuwenhuys
 Solomon Nikritin
 Isamu Noguchi
 Kenneth Noland
 Emil Nolde

O
 Brian O'Doherty
 Georgia O'Keeffe
 Claes Oldenburg
 Jules Olitski
 Nathan Oliveira

P
 Nam June Paik
 Niki de Saint Phalle
 Eduardo Paolozzi
 David Park
 Ray Parker
 George Passantino
 Waldo Peirce
 I. Rice Pereira
 Francis Picabia
 Pablo Picasso
 Jackson Pollock
 Larry Poons
 Liubov Popova
 Fuller Potter
 Richard Pousette-Dart

R
 Sughra Rababi
 Robert Rauschenberg
 Man Ray
 Kliment Red'ko
 Peter Reginato
 Ad Reinhardt
 Manuel Rendón
 Pierre-Auguste Renoir
 Bohuslav Reynek
 Gerhard Richter
 Bridget Riley
 Diego Rivera 
 Manuel Rivera
 Alexander Rodchenko
 Auguste Rodin
 Nicholas Roerich
 Olga Rozanova
 James Rosenquist
 Mark Rothko
 Susan Rothenberg
 Henri Rousseau
 Edward Ruscha
 Albert Pinkham Ryder

S
 Egon Schiele
 Oskar Schlemmer
 Kurt Schwitters
 George Segal
 Richard Serra
 Pablo Serrano
 Georges-Pierre Seurat
 Ben Shahn
 Charles Sheeler
 Sally Sheinman
 Harry Shoulberg
 Paul Signac
 Josef Šíma
David Simpson
 David Smith
 Tony Smith
 Robert Smithson
 Joan Snyder
 Chaïm Soutine
 Václav Špála
 Austin Osman Spare
 Nicolas de Staël
 Theodoros Stamos
 Frank Stella
 Joseph Stella
 Hedda Sterne
 Clyfford Still
 Jindřich Štyrský
 Graham Sutherland
 Patrick Swift

T
 Tarsila do Amaral
 Enrique Tábara
 Atsuko Tanaka
 Dorothea Tanning
 Antoni Tàpies
 Vladimir Tatlin
 Paul Thek
 Wayne Thiebaud
 William Tillyer
 Jean Tinguely
 Alton Tobey
 Mark Tobey
 Bradley Walker Tomlin
 Toyen
 Richard Tuttle
 Cy Twombly

U
Nadezhda Udaltsova

V
 Victor Vasarely
 Vladimír Vašíček
 Kuno Veeber
 Aníbal Villacís
 Juan Villafuerte
 Keratza Vissulceva
 Oswaldo Viteri
 Maurice de Vlaminck
Marc Vaux
 Wolf Vostell
 Édouard Vuillard

W 

 Andy Warhol
 Ilse Weber
 Tom Wesselmann
 Jan de Weryha-Wysoczanski
 James Abbott McNeill Whistler
 Thornton Willis
 Isaac Witkin
 Grant Wood
 Andrew Wyeth

X
Xul Solar

Y
Taro Yamamoto
Peter Young

Z
Larry Zox
Jan Zrzavý

See also
Art
List of painters
List of contemporary artists
Modernist project

Modern